The Mengzhu Mountains, also known as Mingzhu Mountains (名渚岭) are a group of mountain ranges located in Guangxi and Hunan Provinces, one of the Five Ranges in the Nanling Ranges.

References

Ranges of the Nanling Mountains
Mountains of Yongzhou
Geography of Guilin